The Authentics Foundation is an international non-governmental organization that raises public awareness of counterfeits.

On 10 March 2008 The Authentics Foundation hosted the Fakes Cost More summit in Brussels, Belgium, to launch an international campaign against counterfeit goods. European Commission President José Manuel Durão Barroso opened with a speech discussing the economic, social and health risks associated with counterfeits. Supermodel Yasmin Le Bon and actress Alice Taglioni endorsed the movement, telling media that the human cost of fakes is far higher than most consumers believe. Valerie Salembier, Senior VP/Publisher Harper's Bazaar spoke about her magazines highly successful Fakes are Never in Fashion campaign, which informs readers about the hidden costs of fakes—including child labor.

External links
 Authentics Foundation Homepage
 Harper's Bazaar, Fakes are Never in Fashion
 President Barroso's speech, Fakes Cost More Summit
 ITN - Counterfeit conference held in Brussels
 Sina, China - 视频：英国名模耶斯敏参加布鲁塞尔打假峰会 
 Financial Times - Brussels throws weight behind counterfeiting drive
 The Guardian - Forget the Rolexes, fake Ferrari proves $600bn industry has moved up a gear
 BBC News - Fake Ferrari star of piracy show
 International Herald Tribune - EU told of growing dangers from fake goods

Consumer organisations in the United Kingdom
Counterfeit consumer goods